Hildesheim Hauptbahnhof (German for Hildesheim Central Station) is the main railway station for the city of Hildesheim in Lower Saxony, Germany. The station opened in 1961 and is located on the Lehrte–Nordstemmen, Hildesheim–Brunswick and Hildesheim–Goslar railway. The train services are operated by DB Fernverkehr, Erixx, Metronom and NordWestBahn.

History
The first Hildesheim station was opened by the Royal Hanoverian State Railways as the terminus of the Lehrte–Nordstemmen line—the southern arm of its Cross railway—on 12 July 1846 to the north of the present Kaiserstraße, near the current Bahnhofsallee.  After the opening of the Hanoverian Southern Railway the Cross railway was extended on 15 September 1853 to Nordstemmen Station on the Southern Railway. The reception building of the first Hildesheim railway station was a half-timbered building with a slate roof.

The Hanover-Altenbeken Railway Company (German: Hannover-Altenbekener Eisenbahn-Gesellschaft, HAE) was planning to build a rail line from Löhne to Vienenburg, through Hildesheim. Since it became insolvent before the completion of the line, Magdeburg-Halberstädt Railway Company (German: Magdeburg-Halberstädter Eisenbahn-Gesellschaft, MHE) took over the construction of the line as well as the management of the HAE. It opened the line from Hildesheim to Vienenburg on 19 May 1875 and on 1 May 1883 the Brunswick Railway (German: Braunschweigischen Eisenbahn) opened a branch to Goslar, now part of the Hildesheim–Goslar line.

For the additional traffic the HAE built a second track from Nordstemmen to Hildesheim, but at first it had to build a temporary station, the current Hildesheim Ost station, because it was not allowed to use the existing station. Only after the nationalisation of the HAE and its parent the MHE did trains begin to stop at the main railway station on 20 May 1880.

Even without the additional traffic the original station was already too small, and so, after long negotiations with the city it was agreed to build a new station further north. On 4 May 1884, the new station was opened to a design by Hubert Stier in a neo-renaissance style. The old station building was taken apart and rebuilt as Dissen-Bad Rothenfelde station, which still stands. In 1888, the single-track line to Brunswick was opened for long-distance trains running east to Magdeburg and Berlin.

Although the station building was only slightly damaged in the bombing of Hildesheim on 22 March 1945, it was demolished in 1959. In 1961 the station received a new station building in the functional style of the time. The buildings on its island platform were then removed.

The Nordstemmen–Lehrte line was electrified on 29 May 1965 and the line to Brunswick has been worked by electric trains since 30 May 1976. The Hanover–Würzburg high-speed line was connected to Hildesheim by the Hildesheim loop in 1991. Since December 2008, Hildesheim Hauptbahnhof is located on the network of the Hanover S-Bahn. S-Bahn trains leave every hour for Hannover Hauptbahnhof via both Barnten and Sarstedt (S4) and Lehrte (S3). In preparation the platforms of tracks 4/5 and 6/7 were completely renovated in 2008.

The lobby of the Train station was renovated from 2013 to 2016. The original completion was mid 2015, but the renovation caused many problems and was moved to mid 2016.

Train services
The station is served by the following services:

Long-distance

Regional

S-Bahn 
Since December 2008, Hildesheim Hauptbahnhof has been connected to the Hannover S-Bahn. Hourly S-Bahn trains run to Hannover Hauptbahnhof both via Barnten and Sarstedt (S4) and via Lehrte (S3). The platforms of tracks 4/5 and 6/7 were completely rebuilt in 2008 in preparation.

References

Footnotes

Sources

Railway stations in Lower Saxony
Hannover S-Bahn stations
Buildings and structures in Hildesheim
Railway stations in Germany opened in 1961